William Maynard Sarll (9 October 1899 – 6 June 1982) was an Australian rules footballer who played with St Kilda in the Victorian Football League (VFL).

Notes

External links 

1899 births
1982 deaths
Australian rules footballers from Victoria (Australia)
St Kilda Football Club players
Warrnambool Football Club players